276 (two hundred [and] seventy-six) is the natural number following 275 and preceding 277.

In mathematics
276 is the sum of 3 consecutive fifth powers (276 = 15 + 25 + 35). As a figurate number it is a triangular number, a hexagonal number, and a centered pentagonal number, the third number after 1 and 6 to have this combination of properties.

276 is the size of the largest set of equiangular lines in 23 dimensions.

276 is the smallest number for which it is not known if the corresponding aliquot sequence either terminates or ends in a repeating cycle.

In other fields
In the Christian calendar, there are 276 days from the Annunciation on March 25 to Christmas on December 25, a number considered significant by some authors.

References

Integers

ca:Nombre 270#Nombres del 271 al 279